The London District Catholic School Board (LDCSB), known as English-language Separate District School Board No. 38 prior to 1999) is a separate school board offering Catholic education in Southwestern Ontario, Canada. It serves students from the cities of London, St. Thomas and Woodstock, as well as the counties of Elgin, Middlesex and Oxford.

Secondary schools

London 
Catholic Central High School
John Paul II Catholic Secondary School
Mother Teresa Catholic Secondary School
Regina Mundi Catholic College
St. Andre Bessette Catholic Secondary School
St. Thomas Aquinas Secondary School

St. Thomas 
St. Joseph's Catholic High School

Woodstock 
St. Mary's Catholic High School

Elementary schools

Aylmer 
Assumption Catholic School

Delaware 
Our Lady of Lourdes Catholic School

Dorchester 
St. David Catholic School

Glencoe 
St. Charles Catholic School

Ingersoll 
St. Jude's Catholic School

London 
Blessed Sacrament Catholic School
Holy Family Catholic School
Holy Rosary Catholic School
Notre Dame Catholic School
Sir Arthur Carty Catholic School
St. Anne Catholic School
St. Anthony French Immersion Catholic School
St. Bernadette Catholic School
St. Catherine of Siena Catholic School
St. Francis Catholic School
St. George Catholic School
St. John Catholic French Immersion School
St. Jude Catholic School
St. Kateri Catholic School
St. Marguerite d'Youville Catholic School
St. Mark Catholic School
St. Martin Catholic School
St. Mary Choir & Orchestra Catholic School
St. Michael Catholic School
St. Nicholas Catholic School
St. Paul Catholic School
St. Pius X Catholic School
St. Rose of Lima Catholic Elementary School
St. Sebastian Catholic School
St. Theresa Catholic School
St. Thomas More Catholic School

Lucan 
St. Patrick Catholic School

Parkhill 
Sacred Heart Catholic School

St. Thomas 
Monsignor Morrison Catholic School
St. Anne's Catholic School

Strathroy 
Our Lady Immaculate Catholic School
St. Vincent de Paul Catholic School

Tillsonburg 
Monsignor J.H. O'Neil Catholic School
St. Joseph's Catholic School

West Lorne 
St. Mary's Catholic School

Woodstock 
Holy Family French Immersion Catholic School
St. Michael's Catholic School
St. Patrick's Catholic School

Adult and Continuing Education

London 
Centre for Lifelong Learning

See also
List of Schools in London, Ontario
List of School Districts in Ontario
List of High Schools in Ontario
Thames Valley District School Board

References

Roman Catholic school districts in Ontario
Education in London, Ontario